Ulikkal is a growing town in Kannur District in Kerala. It is the HQ of Ulikkal Grama Panchayat in Iritty Taluk. Kerala State Hill highway SH 59 passes through Ulikkal Town.

Location
Ulikkal is situated 7.5 km north of Taluk HQ Iritty, 49 km from District HQ Kannur and 10 km away from Kootupuzha (Kerala-Karnataka border).

Demographics
As of 2011 Census, Ulikkal Grama Panchayat had total population of 35,429, of which 17,457 are males and 17,952 are females. The sex ratio of Ulikkal was 1,028 lower than state average of 1,084. Population of children in the age group 0-6 was 3,648 (10.3%) where 1,895 are males and 1,753 are females. Ulikkal had an overall literacy of 94.8% higher than state average of 94%. The male literacy stands at 96.6% and female literacy was 93.1%. 
Ulikkal Grama Panchayat consists of two revenue villages like Nuchiyad and Vayathur under its administration limits.

History

This village is near Vayathur village panchayat area and contains the Bythoor or Baithur (Vayathur) temple. Bythoorappa (Vayathoorappan) Vayathur Kaliyar Shiva Kshethra dating back to more than 300 years is one of the temples in the panchayat, situated on the banks of Valapattanam river 3 km from the town. This river starts from Kodagu and flows through Parikkalam and Nuchyad villages. This Eshwara (Shiva or Mahadeva) temple is in Kodagu (which is nearby) and is a major pilgrimage temple for the Kodavas (natives of Kodagu). The Kodavas and the Malayalis celebrate the annual temple festival together As per tradition. The temple priests of Kodagu were Namboothiri.  Kodagu is the district neighbouring Kannur district of which Ulikkal forms a part. The temple Gods of Kodagu are of Kerala origin. Folklore says that the Gods entered Kodagu from Kerala, thousands of years ago, via Vayathur (Bythoor) in Kerala and near the Kodagu border. Formerly Ulikkal formed a part of Vayathur.

Places of worship
 St Mary's church,  Thermala, near parikkalam
  Vayathur Kaliyar Shiva (Bythoorappa) temple of Ulikkal
Church of God in India,Ulikkal 
Assemblies of God church(Pentecostal church), Ulickal
India Pentecostal Church of God, Kolithattu
Assemblies of God church, Arabi
  St. Joseph's Latin Church, Infant Jesus Church
  Kodaparambu maqam, 6 kilometers from Ulickal (Ulikkal) and two Mosques (Sunni and Mujahid) within Ulickal Panchayath.
  Infant Jesus Church Ulikkal
  St Joseph's Church Arabi
  St. George's Church Puravayal
  St Thomas' Church Manikkadavu
  St Mary's Church Manippara
  St Antony's Church Anara
  St Joseph's shrine Korayenga
  St Jude Chapel&Shrine Vengalode 
  St Alphonsa Church Vatiamthode
  St Mary's shrine Vatiamthode
  St Mary's Church Mattara
  A mosque Nuchiayad
  A mosque Karimakayam
 St Sebastian's Forana Church Nellicampoil
Arohanam marathoma church Arabi

Geography
Ulikkal is a hilly village on the eastern side of Kannur district.  The terrain is undulating in nature and the extreme eastern side has forests bordering Karnataka state.

Economy
Ulikkal Panchayat is mainly an agrarian economy. The major crops are Rubber, Cashew, Coconut and Areca nut here. Ulikkal was one of the Panchayats in Kannur district that were severely affected by 2018 Kerala floods which caused heavy economic loss for the farmers. 12 hectares of cropped area (mostly rubber and cashew) was destroyed by strong winds. The main affected areas in the Panchayat were in the side slope of midlands (43 m) and mid-highlands (178 m) like Kalanki, Kolithatt, Vayathur, Arabikulam and Kokkad.

Educational institutions

 Government Higher Secondary school, Ulikkal
 Floweret English Medium School, 1 km from Ulikkal at AKG Nagar
 St. Thomas High School, Manikkadavu 
 St. Joseph High School, Arabi
 There are many primary schools nearby Ulikkal, mainly the ones at Vayathur, Arabi, Mattara, Nuchiyad, Nellickampoyil and Perumballi, as well as the GLPS Puravayal and Sharada Vilasam AUP School Parikkalam.

Transportation
Kerala State Highway SH 59 passes through Ulikkal town which connects nearby towns and villages in the hilly terrains of Kannur district. The road to the east of Ulikkal connects to Mysore and Bangalore.

National Highway NH 66 passes through Taliparamba town of 43 km away. Mangalore and Mumbai can be accessed on the northern side and Cochin and Thiruvananthapuram can be accessed on the southern side. The nearest railway station is Kannur on Shoranur-Mangalore section line.

The nearest airport is Kannur International Airport 27 km away. Thalassery, Kannur and Taliparamba are equidistant from Ulikkal.

References

Villages near Iritty

st:Mary's Church Mattara